Papyrus 127 (in the Gregory-Aland numbering), designated by 𝔓127, is a copy of a small part of the New Testament in Ancient Greek. It is a papyrus manuscript of the Acts of the Apostles.

Description 
The surviving texts of Acts are verses 10:32-35, 40–45; 11:2-5, 30; 12:1-3, 5, 7–9; 15:29-31, 34–36, (37), 38–41; 16:1-4, 13–40; 17:1-10, they are in a fragmentary condition. The manuscript palaeographically has been assigned to the 5th century (INTF). Written in two columns per page, between 22 and 26 lines per page (originally).

See also 
 List of New Testament papyri
 Oxyrhynchus Papyri
 Biblical manuscript

References

Sources
D.C. Parker, S.R. Pickering, The Oxyrhynchus Papyri LXXIV, London 2009, 1-45, Pl. II-V

External links 

 Continuation List Institute for New Testament Textual Research, University of Münster. Retrieved March 29, 2010
 P.Oxy.LXIV 4968 from Papyrology at Oxford's "POxy: Oxyrhynchus Online"
 G. Gäbel, “The Text of P127 (P.Oxy. 4968) and its Relationship with the Text of Codex Bezae”, Novum Testamentum 53, 2011, 107–152.

New Testament papyri
5th-century biblical manuscripts
Acts of the Apostles papyri